Stretton-on-Fosse railway station was a railway station which served the village of Stretton-on-Fosse, Warwickshire, England. It was located north-east of the village near the Fosse Way road.

History
In 1836 a tram with horse-drawn cars began passing through the village, operated by the Stratford and Moreton Tramway on a four-feet gauge rail. After the company's insolvency in 1868 the line was purchased by The Great Western Railway.

The tramway was converted into a steam operated branch line by the Great Western railway in 1889, between Moreton-in-Marsh and Shipston-on-Stour which was used for passengers until 1929 and goods until 1960. A railway station was not built at Stretton-on-Fosse until November 1892, in the north-east part of the village near the Fosse Way road. Before completion of construction, the train would stop on request at the nearby Golden Cross Inn.

Present day
The site is now in private ownership with the former station masters house still standing. The trackbed has since been returned to agricultural use.

References

 Stretton on Fosse Station: An Ordnance Survey map of Stretton on Fosse station updated in 1900 published in 1903
 GWR Route: Moreton-in-Marsh to Shipston-on-Stour
 Station Lodge (ref UK10611) in Stretton-on-Fosse, near Moreton-in-Marsh  Cottages.com
 Stretton on Fosse Station
 The Shipston-on-Stour Branch by Stanley C Jenkins and Roger Carpenter - Warwickshire Railways
 Shipston-on-Stour Branch
 Shipston-on-Stour Branch
 The Shipston on Stour Branch
 Rail Album - Stratford-upon-Avon & Moreton-in-Marsh Railway - Page 3

Disused railway stations in Warwickshire
Railway stations in Great Britain opened in 1836
Railway stations in Great Britain closed in 1960